Eriocottidae or Old World spiny-winged moths is a family of insects in the order Lepidoptera whose position relative to other members of the superfamily Tineoidea is currently unknown. There are two subfamilies, Compsocteninae and Eriocottinae.

Systematics
Eriocottinae Spuler, 1898
Crepidochares Meyrick, 1922
Dacryphanes Meyrick, 1908
Deuterotinea Rebel, 1901
Eriocottis Zeller, 1847
Tetracladessa Gozmány & Vári, 1975
Compsocteninae Dierl, 1970
Cathalistis Meyrick, 1917
Compsoctena Zeller, 1852
Filiramifera Mey, 2019
Kruegerellus Mey & Sobczyk, 2019
Eocompsoctena Ngo-Muller, Engel, Nel, & Nel, 2020
Eucryptogona Lower, 1901
Picrospora Meyrick, 1912

Former genera
Picrospora (transferred to Psychidae, but see Mey, 2011, for placement in Eriocottidae)

References

External links
Tree of Life
Natural History Museum Lepidoptera genus database

 
Moth families